The Abruzzo regional election of 1970 took place on 7–8 June 1970.

Events
Christian Democracy was by far the largest party, gaining more than twice the share of vote of the Italian Communist Party, which came distantly second. The position of President of Abruzzo was held by Ugo Crescenzi (1970–1972), Giustino De Cecco (1972–1973), Ugo Crescenzi (1973–1974) and again Ugo Crescenzi (1974–1975), all Christian Democrats.

Results

Source: Ministry of the Interior

Elections in Abruzzo
1970 elections in Italy
June 1970 events in Europe